This is a list of the former Latvian commanders, which also includes the Latvian officers who have served in the Imperial Russian Army, Wehrmacht, Waffen SS and the military commanders, who have retired since the restoration of the Republic of Latvia in 1991:

Superior officers
 Generals and Admirals

 Andrejs Auzāns (1871-1953)
 Žanis Bahs (1885-1941)
 Jānis Balodis (1881-1965)
 Jezups Baško (1886-1946)
 Krišjānis Berķis (1884-1942)
 Ludvigs Bolšteins (1888-1940)
 Alberts Brambats (1881-1943)
 Andrejs Bubinduss (1891-1942)
 Hermanis Buks (1896-1942)
 Jānis Buivids (1864-1937)
 Arturs Dālbergs (1896-1941)
 Roberts Dambītis (1881-1957)
 Oskars Dankers (1883-1965)
 Arturs Dannebergs (1891-1941)
 Nikolajs Dūze (1891-1951)
 Jānis Ezeriņš (1894-1944)
 Jānis Francis (1877-1956)
 Oto Grosbarts (1895-1944)
 Mārtiņš Hartmanis (1882-1941)
 Jānis Teodors Indāns (1895-1941)
 Martiņš Jeske (1883-1941)
 Aleksandrs Kalējs (1876-1934)
 Bruno Kalniņš (1899-1990)
 Eduards Kalniņš (1876-1964)
 Roberts Klaviņš (1885-1941)
 Rūdolfs Klinsons (1889-1941)
 Andrejs Krustiņš (1884-1941)
 Jānis Kurelis (1882-1954)
 Arvīds Kurše (1896-1953)
 Jānis Lavenieks (1890-1969)
 Jānis Liepiņš (general) (1894-1942)
 Augusts Ernests Misiņš (1863-1940)
 Kārlis Prauls (1895-1941)
 Mārtiņš Peniķis (1874-1964)
 Hugo Rozenšteins (1892-1941)
 Voldemārs Johans Skaistlauks (1892-1972)
 Vilis Spandegs (1890-1941)
 Teodors Spāde (1891 - 1970)
 Verners Tepfers (1893-1958)
 Oto Ūdentiņš (1892-1988)
 Fricis Virsaitis (1892-1943)

 Lieutenant Generals and Vice Admirals

 Rūdolfs Bangerskis (1878 - 1958)
 Raimonds Graube (1957-)

 Major Generals and Rear Admirals 

 Juris Maklakovs (1964-)

 Brigadier-Generals and Commodores 

 Kārlis Krēsliņš (1945-)

Senior officers
Colonels and Captens

 Kārlis Aperāts (1892 - 1944) 
 Fridrihs Briedis (1888 - 1918)
 Vilis Janums (1894 - 1981) 
 Oskars Kalpaks (1882 – 1919)
 Kārlis Lobe (1895 - 1985)
 Voldemārs Ozols (1884 - 1949)
 Jorģis Zemitāns (1873 - 1928)

Lieutenant Colonels and Commanders

 Nikolajs Galdiņš (1902 - 1945)
 Voldemārs Veiss (1899 - 1944)

Majors and Lieutenant Commanders
 Voldemārs Reinholds (1903 - 1986)

Junior Officers
Captens and Lieutenants

 Miervaldis Adamsons (1910 - 1946)
 Žanis Butkus (1906 - 1999) 
 Roberts Ancāns (1919 - 1982)
 Roberts Gaigals (1913 - 1982)
 Oskars Perro (1918 - 2003)
 Aleksandrs Grīns (1895 - 1941)

See also

 Military of Latvia
 List of Latvian commanders
 Military of Lithuania
 List of former Lithuanian commanders
 List of Lithuanian commanders
 Military of Estonia
 List of former Estonian commanders
 List of Estonian commanders

Notable fighter pilots

Notes and references

Military of Latvia